William Stewart MacGeorge (1861–1931) was a Scottish artist associated with the Kirkcudbright School.  Born in Castle Douglas, lived at 120 King St. He attended the Royal Institution Art School in Edinburgh before studying under Charles Verlat in Antwerp. After becoming influenced by Edward Atkinson Hornel, who had also studied under Verlat, MacGeorge began using brighter colours. William Stewart MacGeorge later married the widow of Hugh Munro and settling in Gifford in East Lothian where he died. His widow bequeathed about 45 of his paintings to Haddington Town Council. He is fictionalised in the 1907 novel  Little Esson, by his boyhood friend S.R. Crockett

References  

1861 births
1931 deaths
19th-century Scottish painters
20th-century Scottish painters
People from Castle Douglas
Scottish male painters
19th-century Scottish male artists
20th-century Scottish male artists